SC Goldau  are a Swiss football team based in Goldau, currently playing in Liga 2.,
the fourth tier in the Swiss football pyramid Group 3. The club was formed in 1946.

They finished 2008/2009 season in 9th position.

Staff and board members

 Trainer:Genesio Colatrella
 Assistant Trainer:John Erniger
 Physio: Raphael Fässler
 President: Ralf Ehrbar
 Vice President: Andreas Luig
 Secretary : Michelle Süess-Spielmann
 Treasurer : Erwin Zurfluh

External links
 http://www.scgoldau.ch   

Association football clubs established in 1946
Goldau
1946 establishments in Switzerland